The aldehyde oxidase and xanthine dehydrogenase, a/b hammerhead domain is an evolutionary conserved protein domain.

Aldehyde oxidase catalyzes the conversion of an aldehyde in the presence of oxygen and water to an acid and hydrogen peroxide. The enzyme is a homodimer, and requires FAD, molybdenum and two 2FE-2S clusters as cofactors. Xanthine dehydrogenase catalyzes the hydrogenation of xanthine to urate, and also requires FAD, molybdenum and two 2FE-2S clusters as cofactors. This activity is often found in a bifunctional enzyme with xanthine oxidase activity too. The enzyme can be converted from the dehydrogenase form to the oxidase form irreversibly by proteolysis or reversibly through oxidation of sulfhydryl groups.

Human proteins containing this domain 
 AOX1, XDH

Further reading 

 
 
 

Protein domains